Brosimum glaziovii is a species of plant in the family Moraceae.

Description
It is endemic to Atlantic Forest habitats of southeastern Brazil, within Paraná (state), Rio de Janeiro (state), Santa Catarina (state), and São Paulo (state).

Its populations are largely confined to the Serra do Mar. It occurs in Tijuca National Park

Conservation
It is an IUCN Red List Endangered species threatened by habitat loss, which continues to be rapidly destroyed.

It is on the official list of threatened Brazilian plants compiled by Brazilian Institute of Environment and Renewable Natural Resources—IBAMA.

References

glaziovii
Endemic flora of Brazil
Flora of the Atlantic Forest
Flora of Paraná (state)
Flora of Rio de Janeiro (state)
Flora of Santa Catarina (state)
Flora of São Paulo (state)
Endangered flora of South America
Taxonomy articles created by Polbot